The 2006 Viña del Mar International Song Festival, or simply 2006 Viña del Mar Festival, was held on 22 to February 27, 2006 in the Quinta Vergara Amphitheater, Viña del Mar, Chile. Transmitted and organized by Canal 13, was led by Ricardo de la Fuente y presented by Sergio Lagos and Myriam Hernández.

Viña del Mar International Song Festival by year
Vina Del Mar International Song Festival, 2006
2006 in music
2006 festivals in Chile
2006 music festivals